In Canadian football, a single (also called a single point, or rouge) is a one-point score that is awarded for certain plays that involve the ball being kicked into the end zone and not returned from it.

Rules
A single is awarded when the ball is kicked into the end zone by any legal means—other than a convert (successful or not) or a successful field goal—and the receiving team does not return (or kick) the ball out of its end zone. A single is also scored if a kick—excluding kickoffs—goes out of bounds in the end zone without being touched.

A single is indicated by the referee raising his right arm and index finger. After conceding a single, the receiving team is awarded possession of the ball at its 35-yard line (Football Canada rules) or 40-yard line (CFL rules).

Singles are not awarded in the following situations:
 if a ball is downed in the end zone after being intercepted in the end zone
 if a ball is fumbled from the field of play into the end zone
 if the kicked ball hits the goalposts (since the 1970s; before then it was a live ball)
 when a kickoff goes into the end zone and then out of bounds without being touched

In each of the above cases, the defending team is awarded possession of the ball at its 25-yard line.

In the official rules, the single point is also called a rouge, French for "red". The origin is unclear.

There is one other way to score one point on a gridiron football play, other than a routine extra point. If either team scores a safety on a conversion attempt after a touchdown, one point is awarded.

Canadian Football League
The Canadian Football League (CFL) has discussed abolishing the single, but proposals to do so have been rejected. A 2005 proposal to reduce scenarios resulting in a single on missed field goal attempts was also rejected. A less-sweeping proposal would see the single eliminated on punts and field goal attempts that travel through the sidelines of the end zone – such a change would eliminate the "consolation" point for a failed coffin corner attempt. Other proposals would have the rouge scored only on kicks scrimmaged from beyond a certain point or are otherwise deemed 'returnable', having touched the end zone or a return team player without being advanced back into the field of play.

The lowest scoring game in CFL history, a 1–0 victory by the Montreal Alouettes over the Ottawa Rough Riders in 1966, had no scoring except for a single in the fourth quarter on a missed field goal attempt.

In the CFL and its predecessor leagues, the most rouges ever scored by one kicker in a game is 11, by Ben Simpson of the Hamilton Tigers against the Montreal AAA Winged Wheelers on October 29, 1910. The final score was 14–7 in favour of Hamilton. However, this was before the modern CFL was founded, and so it does not count as a CFL record.

Other football codes 

In American football, Canadian football-type singles are not used. Receiving teams are allowed to down the ball in the end zone for a touchback, and kicking the ball out of bounds through the end zone also results in a touchback; in either case, the receiving team receives possession of the ball at either its own 20- or 25-yard line, depending on the specific level of play.

Some indoor American football leagues have used the single, namely the National Indoor Football League, the American Indoor Football Association and the Professional Indoor Football League, all now defunct. The single was applied only on kickoffs, and was scored if the receiving team failed to advance the ball out of the end zone when kicked. The NIFL and AIFA also allowed a single to be scored by kicking a kickoff through the uprights (as in a field goal); this type of single was nicknamed (and was later codified in the AIFA rules as) an uno, from the Spanish word for the number one.

The concept of the rouge dates back to several public school sports played in England from the early 19th century. In Rossall Hockey played at Rossall School, and the Eton field game, both of which are still played, a rouge can be scored after the ball has gone into the local equivalent of the 'end zone' after striking another player. The Sheffield Rules, a 19th-century code of football, also used the rouge as a secondary scoring method, as did the first rules formulated by the Football Association in 1863. The behind used in Australian rules football is similar in concept to the Canadian single (worth one point whereas goals are worth six), as is the point in Gaelic football, hurling, and camogie (where a ball into the net scores three points, while a ball passing over the crossbar scores one).

See also
Glossary of Canadian football

References

Further reading

External links
CFL Rules 101 via YouTube

Canadian football terminology